2019 World Junior-B Curling Championships may refer to:

2019 World Junior-B Curling Championships (January), championship held to qualify teams for the 2019 World Junior Curling Championship
2019 World Junior-B Curling Championships (December), championship held to qualify teams for the 2020 World Junior Curling Championship